Amherst Head  is a community in the Canadian province of Nova Scotia, located in  Cumberland County.

According to the book  Place-Names and Places of Nova Scotia, Amherst Head is "located on the road from Amherst to Pugwash, west of Pugwash. Among the grantees were Dixon and John Trenholm, 1818 and Jonathan Tindell and Barnet Webb, 1820. A way office was established in 1852 and a school built in 1873. The population in 1856 was 156."

In 2005, Heritage Gas built a 17.6 km natural gas pipeline through Amherst Head to Amherst, NS. In 2004, Sunrise Swine Genetics built a hog farm in Amherst Head. The community is rural, with an abundance of natural wildlife.

References
 Amherst Head on Destination Nova Scotia
 Place-Names and Places of Nova Scotia
Google map

Communities in Cumberland County, Nova Scotia